Erik Feig is an American film executive and producer. In May 2019, Feig launched Picturestart with backing from Warner Bros., Endeavor Content, and Bron Studios and access to Scholastic Corporation's IP. He served as co-president of the Lionsgate Motion Picture Group, and president of Summit Entertainment. He has produced, supervised and originated the production of Academy Award-winning films including La La Land and The Hurt Locker, along with book adaptations and films geared toward the youth market, including The Twilight Saga, The Hunger Games series, Divergent series, Red series and Step Up series. According to The New York Times, "Feig has built a reputation among book authors for cinematic adaptations." As of 2017, films he has supervised or produced have collectively grossed over $12 billion at the box office worldwide.

Early life and education
Feig was born in Los Angeles, California, and raised in Westport, Connecticut. He attended Vanderbilt University in Nashville, Tennessee, for one year. After taking a year off to travel, he transferred to Columbia University in New York City, graduating with a BA in English in 1992. At Columbia, Feig lived in East Campus and studied under James S. Shapiro, Annette Insdorf, and David Denby.

Career

Independent producing (1997-2000)
Feig began his career as an independent producer, working with Sony Pictures producing films including I Know What You Did Last Summer, I Still Know What You Did Last Summer and Slackers, all for Sony Pictures. He had a producing deal with Artisan Entertainment, before being recruited to run the film department at Summit Entertainment.

Summit Entertainment (2001-11)
In 1998 Summit Entertainment, a sales agent at the time, launched its own production department with Splendor and Kill the Man, and by 2001, Feig joined Summit as president of production and acquisitions. He became a partner in 2007. During his tenure at Summit, he was involved in obtaining distribution rights to The Hurt Locker, which won the Academy Award for Best Picture; produced all five films in the Step Up dance franchise, which grossed $651 million worldwide, provided Channing Tatum with his breakthrough role, whose TV spinoff was the first scripted drama acquired by YouTube Red, and which The New York Times called "one of pop culture's most enduring franchises"; and developed films including the Red film series, Source Code, 50/50 and Letters to Juliet.

Feig brought the Twilight book series to Summit after Paramount Pictures passed on it. Although at the time the book had sold only 4,000 copies, Feig noted its strong following online, and its potential to be a franchise for the new studio. He pursued the project and was able to make a deal with author Stephenie Meyer by guaranteeing that the film would be true to her novels. Feig secured the rights to all four books in February 2006. The five films in The Twilight Saga would go on to gross $3.3 billion worldwide and would be the first major roles for Robert Pattinson, Kristen Stewart and Anna Kendrick.

Lionsgate (2012-2019)
Summit was sold to Lionsgate for $412.5 million in 2012, and Feig was named president of production for Lionsgate Motion Picture Group. In February 2014, he was promoted to co-president of Lionsgate Motion Picture Group, overseeing film production and development for the Lionsgate and Summit labels.

Feig first learned of La La Land at the Sundance Film Festival in 2014, when he met with Damien Chazelle, who pitched him his script for a Hollywood musical. At the time, the script was in development at Focus Features. Feig secured a $30 million budget for Lionsgate to produce the film, gambling on the unusual undertaking of an original Hollywood musical. Chazelle's first feature Whiplash had not yet been released when the deal was made. In 2016, La La Land received a record-tying 14 Academy Award nominations, winning six. That year, Lionsgate had the most Oscar nominations of any studio, with 26.

With Lionsgate, Feig has originated, supervised and produced films including The Hunger Games series (Jennifer Lawrence's first starring role in a major studio film), the Divergent series, Now You See Me, Sicario, Hacksaw Ridge, The Perks of Being a Wallflower, Sinister, Warm Bodies, Mr. and Mrs. Smith, Power Rangers, Chaos Walking, The Kingkiller Chronicle and Uncle Drew. Feig optioned the rights to R.J. Palacio's novel Wonder before it was published. Receiving strong reviews, Wonder over-performed at the box office, taking in $27.1 million over opening weekend, which was triple what analysts expected.

In February 2018, it was reported that Feig would be leaving Lionsgate, and that he has raised money to launch a new company focused on youth-oriented projects. Lionsgate is expected to be one of the investors in the new company.

Picturestart
In May 2019, Feig announced the launch of Picturestart, a "new media" company. Scholastic granted the company access to its IP. Picturestart intends to produce four to six films and four to six TV series per year.

Honors
Feig was named to the Variety 500 list of the 500 most influential people in the entertainment industry. He was an honoree for the LA's Promise 2012 gala. In 2013 he received the Dizzy Feet Foundation Impact Award, for his support of dance and the arts through the Step Up films, credited "with exposing millions of people around the world to the art of dance." He is a ReFrame ambassador for gender balance in the entertainment industry. He received the John Jay Award from Columbia University in 2019.

Personal life
Feig lives in Los Angeles, California, with his wife Susanna Felleman and their two children. They were married in New York in 2002.

Feig is a founding board member of LA's Promise, a nonprofit helping students and families in Los Angeles's needy neighborhoods; a founding board member of The Systemic Change Project, which promotes gender balance in the entertainment industry; a board member of the Columbia University School of the Arts; a board member of RepresentUs; a board member of City Year Los Angeles and chair of its Spring Break benefit; and ambassador for the Women in Film and Sundance Institute's ReFrame Project.

Filmography

References

External links
 
 Erik Feig on Bloomberg.com

Living people
People from Westport, Connecticut
Vanderbilt University alumni
Columbia College (New York) alumni
American film studio executives
Film producers from California
Film producers from Connecticut
Year of birth missing (living people)